Lost Island Theme Park is a theme park in Waterloo, Iowa. The  park includes five themed lands, which feature numerous attractions; including three roller coasters. Lost Island Theme Park is owned by the Bertch family, who operate the Lost Island Waterpark, which is located next to the site of the theme park. Construction on Lost Island Theme Park began in August 2019, it opened on June 18, 2022, and it cost an estimated $100 million.

History

Planning and construction

In 2001, Bertch Cabinet Manufacturing, owned by the Bertch family, opened Lost Island Waterpark. Over time, the water park expanded, and it became ranked among the best water parks in the United States. Planning for the theme park began in 2016, with a Lost continents theme featuring Atlantis and Zealandia as themed lands being initially considered before they decided to create an original storyline. On July 15, 2019, the Bertch family announced plans to construct Lost Island Theme Park next to Lost Island Waterpark. The planned  park would be located next to a  lake, and it would feature multiple attractions in five themed lands. The park will feature three roller coasters: the Nopuko Air Coaster, a Suspended Looping Coaster which operated at Ratanga Junction in South Africa as Cobra; Matugani, an Accelerator Coaster, which operated at Liseberg in Sweden; and an SBF/Visa junior Wacky Worm coaster named Lokolo. Construction on Lost Island Theme Park began on August 23, 2019, and was completed in 2022.

Lost Island Theme Park gradually began to unveil ride names and details on their website throughout the summer and fall of 2021. The park's Volkanu: Quest for the Golden Idol dark ride was formally announced during a press conference at the annual IAAPA Expo in Orlando, Florida. The park purchased a variety of new and used rides alike from a handful of manufacturers, including Zamperla, SBF Visa Group, Moser's Rides, Gerstlauer, and Interlink.

On March 10, 2022, a fire destroyed the queue building, loading station and control system for Yuta Falls, an Interlink log flume ride.

First season
The park ended its first season earlier than originally scheduled due to lack of attendance and staffing issues. The delays with Matugani and Yuta Falls have been cited as a likely leading factor in the underwhelming attendance figures. Additionally, manufacturer delays kept the Nika's Gift carousel from even being delivered to the park during its first year.

Rides

Tamariki Spirit Realm
Home to the park's attractions for kids, this realm is the domain of the Tamariki, small mischievous spirits that maintain the balance of the four elements on the Lost Island.
Kapulele Gliders - Zamperla Magic Bikes
Mama Pezaki - Zamperla Crazy Bus
Mura Dancer - Zamperla Pounce N' Bounce
Ohu Hoppers - Zamperla Jump Around
Golapa Sprouts - Zamperla Samba Tower
Lokolo - SBF Visa Wacky Worm
Tuka Tumbler - Zamperla Mini Ferris Wheel

Udara Air Realm

Home of the Udara Air Kingdom, a colony of steampunk-styled inventors who build things that harness the power of air with the goal of rebuilding a floating city that once hovered over the rest of the island.

Amara Aviators - Gerstlauer Sky Fly
Skyborne - S&S Turbo Drop
Dream Spinner - Zamperla Midi Family Swinger
Nopuko Air Coaster - Vekoma SLC with Extended Helix

Awa Water Realm

Home of the Awa Water Nomads, who enjoy simple pleasures and adventure. Spread across the eastern shore of the park's lake and the park's central island.

Alzanu's Eye - Ferris Wheel
Eeki Eeki Escape - Flying Carousel 
Sea Swell - Swinging Pirate Ship
Awaati Water Battle - Interlink Splash Battle
Nika's Gift - Carousel
Wakani Whirl - Zamperla Mini Tea Cups
Zulawa Wave - Bertazzon Music Express

Yuta Earth Realm

Home of the Yuta Earth Tribe, who learned to live in balance with the forest and protect nature after their mining and logging efforts nearly collapsed their society. A giant ancient tree named Namua that rooted itself into a stone building serves as the entrance to one of the park's restaurants, the Totara Market.

Matugani - Intamin Accelerator Coaster
Yuta Falls - Interlink Super Flume
Kukui Station - Spin Zone Bumper Cars

Mura Fire Realm
A village built on the foothills of a volcano, this realm is home to the Mura Fire Clan, a spiritual sect of warriors and acrobats that protect the island from the malevolent fire demon Volkanu.
Volkanu: Quest for the Golden Idol - Sally Corporation Dark Ride
Shaman's Curse - Zamperla Disk O' Coaster
Rokava - Moser's Rides Maverick Top Spin
Mura Fury - Moser's Rides Sidewinder

Play Areas 
Lost Island has a number of play areas for children, and two interactive installations.
 Akua Maze - water play area in the Awa realm.
 Avarium - kinetic wind exhibit in the Udara realm.
 Makatu Shrine - an interactive display at the bottom of the volcano in the Mura realm.
 Sand Castle - a small play area behind the Thirsty Voyage in the Awa realm, with an adjacent playground.
 Tamikoa Grotto - the largest play area in the park, in the Tamariki realm.

Food 
Each realm of Lost Island has either a snack stand or a counter-service restaurant.
 Kotaki Treats - snack stand in the Mura realm.
 Thirsty Voyager - drink and snack stand in the Awa realm. In 2022, this was the only location in the park service adult beverages which included beer, seltzers and frozen cocktails.
 Totara Market - counter service indoor restaurant in the Yuta realm.
 Whalebone Grill - counter service indoor restaurant in the Awa realm.
 Ummi Ummis - snack stand in the Tamariki realm.

Shopping 
There are only three gift shops in the park:
 Island Emporium - the largest shop, near the entrance.
 Tamariki Trinkets - in the Tamariki realm.
 Treasure Cache - at the exit of Volkanu in the Mura realm.

Mascots/Characters 
The park's primary mascots are the Tamariki, the nature spirits that protect the balance of the four elements on the island. A walkaround character, Aoka, the Tamariki of Friendship, greets guests in the park's entry courtyard Ara Matua. Twelve Tamariki sculptures are distributed throughout the park and twenty named Tamariki appear as collectible avatars in the park's supplementary Lost Island Adventure Guide app alongside twenty four villagers (six for each of the four elemental realms).

References

Lost Island Theme Park
Amusement parks in Iowa
Amusement parks opened in 2022
2022 establishments in Iowa
Waterloo, Iowa
Tiki culture